Woo Hye-mi (April 6, 1988 – September 21, 2019), also known by her stage name Miwoo, was a South Korean singer. She was known as one of the final four contestants on the 2012 talent show series The Voice of Korea.

On September 21, 2019, Woo was found dead in her home.

Discography

Extended plays

Singles

Filmography

References

External links
 

1988 births
2019 deaths
K-pop singers
South Korean women pop singers
South Korean female idols
The Voice of Korea contestants
21st-century South Korean singers
21st-century South Korean women singers